Prototulbaghia siebertii is the only species in the monotypic genus Prototulbaghia. If was described in 2007 from the Leolo Mountains, Limpopo, South Africa.

References

External links 

Allioideae
Monotypic Amaryllidaceae genera
Endemic flora of South Africa
Endangered plants
Flora of the Northern Provinces